Kristu Jayanti College, founded in the year 1999, managed by "Bodhi Niketan Trust", formed by the members of St. Joseph Province of the Carmelites of Mary Immaculate (CMI). The college is affiliated to Bengaluru North University. The college is recognized by UGC under the category 2(f) & 12(B). The college was accorded autonomous status in 2013 by the University Grants Commission, Government of Karnataka & the Bengaluru North University. The National Assessment and Accreditation Council (NAAC) has accredited Kristu Jayanti College (Autonomous) with A++ grade.The college has been rated with a cumulative grade point average (CGPA) of 3.78 out of 4 in the third cycle of accreditation. it is the second institution in the country and the first in Karnataka to achieve the highest CGPA.

History 

Kristu Jayanti College (Autonomous), founded in 1999, is run by "BODHI NIKETAN TRUST", formed by the members of St. Joseph Province of the Carmelites of Mary Immaculate (CMI). The college is affiliated to Bengaluru North University and is reaccredited with the highest grade 'A++' by NAAC in  2021. The college is recognized by UGC under the category 2(f) & 12(B). The college was accorded autonomous status in 2013 by the University Grants Commission, Government of Karnataka & the Bangalore University.

Kristu Jayanti College is affiliated to the Bengaluru North University.  A majority of higher educational institutions are established in the southern and eastern parts of Bangalore. The northern part of Bangalore District was semi-urban and rural that lacked educational and industrial development. The college was started at K. Narayanapura in Kothanur region. The college had a humble beginning with 1 course, 9 students and 3 full-time academic faculty in 1999, has grown exponentially in programmes (55 programmes including Four PhD programme), in a number of students (10000+) and in full-time faculty strength (450+), all in a matter of 23 years.

Autonomous status 

Kristu Jayanti has become an autonomous college from the academic year 2013–14. It continues to be an affiliated college of the Bengaluru North University. The university offers the degrees to the students after passing the examinations held by the college.

Achievements
International Achievements 
UNAI HUB for SDG1  
 International Accreditation by ACBSP 
Kristu Jayanti college courses are offered under different entities.

Kristu Jayanti School of Management offers two years Management Programme  MBA in International Finance, HR, Finance, Marketing, Business Intelligence & Analytics

Kristu Jayanti College of Law offers five-year Integrated BA LLB, BBA LLB and BCom LLB programmes

Kristu Jayanti College of Arts, Commerce and Science (Autonomous) offers 22 undergraduate programmes in commerce, management, computer science, humanities, biotechnology & microbiology, basic science, and 13 postgraduate programmes. The campus is a melting pot of students across the nation and countries abroad with a total strength of 7000

Deanery  of Humanities 
MSW Master of Social Work
M.Sc. Psychology
M.Sc. Counselling Psychology
M.Sc. Clinical Psychology
MA English Literature
MA Journalism & Mass Communication
BA Journalism, Psychology, Computer Science
BA Journalism, Political Science, English Literature
BA Journalism, Psychology, English Literature
BA History, Economics, Political Science
BA History, Tourism, Journalism
BA Journalism, Economics, English Literature
BA Economics, Political Science, Sociology
BA (Honours) English
BA Performing Arts, Psychology, English Literature
BA Visual Communication
Research Centre - Social Work, Psychology

Deanery of commerce and management 
(Marketing Management | Human Resource Management | Business Administration)

M.Com. Master of Commerce
M.Com. Financial Analysis (FA)
M.Com. FA CGMA Integrated
MA Economics
BBA Bachelor of Business Administration
BBA CGMA Integrated
BBA Business Analytics
BBA Aviation Management
B.Com. Bachelor of Commerce
B.Com. ACCA Integrated
B.Com. Integrated with CMA
B.Com. Professional
B.Com. Tourism
B.Com. Business Analytics
B.Com. Honours
B.Com. Logistics & Supply Chain Management
1 Year PG Diploma for Working Executives
Research Centre - Commerce

Deanery of sciences 
MCA Master of Computer Applications
M.Sc. Computer Science
M.Sc. Biotechnology
M.Sc. Microbiology
M.Sc. Biochemistry
M.Sc. Forensic Science
BCA Bachelor of Computer Applications
BCA in Analytics
B.Sc. Computer Science, Mathematics, Electronics
B.Sc. Computer Science, Mathematics, Statistics
B.Sc. Biotechnology, Biochemistry, Genetics
B.Sc. Botany, Biotechnology, Biochemistry
B.Sc. (Honors) Forensic Science
B.Sc. Microbiology, Biochemistry, Genetics
B.Sc. Physics, Mathematics, Computer Science
B.Sc. Physics, Mathematics, Electronics
B.Sc. Mathematics, Statistics, Economics
Research Centre - Biotechnology

Student support and campus life 
Literary and Cultural Association provide  training programmes for Skit, Mime, one-act play, Guitar and Vocal. The students’ council play an important role in co-ordinating and conducting common college programmes. Intra and Intercollegiate fests are organized by the departments of the college and common programmes listed below keep the campus vibrant, active and conducive for learning

 Kalajyothi (Intra-collegiate Literary & Cultural Fest)
 Kridotsava – Annual Sports day,
 Nrityanjali – Intercollegiate Dance Fest,
 Woodrock – Music Concert,
 Nrityadarpan – Dance Concert,
 Samyagdarshan - College Day and Common Felicitations organized in the quadrangle and auditoria.
 Communal harmony and ethnic day celebrations

Collaborations with foreign universities

Kristu Jayanti College has formal relationships with foreign Universities like the Appalachian State University, United States, Normandie Business School France, FHDW University, Germany and Neu-Ulm University of Applied Sciences (HNU), Germany to promote teaching, research and exchange programme. The institute is actively involved in many international collaborations for advancement of education at KJC Bangalore.
.

Membership in professional bodies

Kristu Jayanti College is a member of the Confederation of Indian Industries (CII), All India Management Association (AIMA), Bangalore Management Association (BMA), Association of Chartered Certified Accountants (ACCA), Chartered Institute of Management Accountants (CIMA), IIM Library, British Council Library, Computer Society of India (CSI), IEEE, ACM Women's Chapter, ICT Academy, International Association of the School of Social Work (IASSW), Biotechnology Consortium of India Limited (BCIL), Association of Biotech Led Enterprises (ABLE), Accreditation Council for Business Schools and Programs (ACBSP) and International Network of Quality Assurance Agencies (INQAA).

Research
The research programmes are affiliated to Bangalore University.

Faculty

Faculty improvement is facilitated through programmes like in–house Faculty Development Programme (FDP), department-level programmes and Participation in FDPs / Conferences/ Seminars at other institutions and colleges. The institution encourages the faculty members to participate and undertake institutional research and to pursue personal research leading to M.Phil. and Ph.D.

Campus
Kristu Jayanti College is an Autonomous College, under Bengaluru North University, one of the largest in the country. The college is located at K.Narayanapura, Bangalore, 11 km away from Vidhana Soudha, the heart of Bangalore City.

Various departments and administrative sections are housed in the Main Block. The MBA and MCA programmes function in a separate block. The college provides class rooms, libraries, auditoria, laboratories, conference halls, panel rooms, music room, gymnasium and sports facilities.

The library also has digital resources including a collection of CDs, databases, e-journals, software and projects. There are separate rooms for group discussion, reading and cubicles for personal study. Moreover, an e-library has been set up for e-resource. The Computer lab is equipped with internet and is open beyond office hours to meet students’ computing needs. The campus is equipped with wi-fi facility. The department of Life Sciences features four laboratories for Genetics, Biochemistry, Biotechnology and Microbiology.

Student life
The college has formed several academic clubs and associations like Environment Club, Commerce Club, Management Association, Tourism Club, Computer Academy, Psychology Club, Erudite Club, Journalism Club, Film Club, Photography Club, Life Science Club, Jayantian Life Science Forum, etc.

The Center for Social Activities (CSA) was established in 2009 as a students’ social movement.

Jayantian services
The Entrepreneurship Development Cell organizes various Entrepreneurship Awareness Camps, Entrepreneurship Development Programmes and Skill Development Programmes in the institution. The cell collaborates with various external agencies and facilitates interaction with entrepreneurs. EDC serves as a mentor for upcoming Jayantian entrepreneurs. EDC has initiated several training programmes in collaboration with the Entrepreneurship Development Institute of India, Ahmedabad. Several diploma and certificate programmes like Open Learning Programme, Diploma in Entrepreneurship Development, HP sponsored Graduate Entre-preneurship Training in Information Technology and also a Certificate Course in Entrepreneurship Development Programme are offered by the EDC. The cell is also collaborating with National Entrepreneurship Network (NEN).

The National Service Scheme (NSS) is a body for social work affiliated to Bangalore University.

The college has an NCC Army wing under 3KAR Bn. Students enroll for a period of 3 years. NCC activities such as parades, camps, outing for map reading, trekking, weapon training, drills, adventure camps, social service, environmental protection, awareness programmes, etc., are organized on a regular basis.

Notable alumni
 Ann Augustine, Actress

References

Colleges in Bangalore